Riruta, also known as Riruta Satellite, is a settlement in the Dagoretti area of Nairobi.

PC Kinyanjui Technical Training Institute, a public, technical institute is located in Riruta.

Riruta Ward is also an electoral division within Dagoretti South Constituency. The whole constituency is within Dagoretti Sub-county.

See also
Dagoretti North Constituency
Karen, Kenya
Waithaka

References

 

Suburbs of Nairobi
Populated places in Kenya